The Galapagos Conservation Trust (GCT) is a British conservation charity (registered number 1043470) which focuses on saving animals at risk of extinction on the Galapagos Islands.  It is a member of the Friends of Galapagos Organisations (also known as the Darwin Network). It was launched in 1995 at the Royal Society in London. The charity fundraises to support pioneering conservation projects in the Islands, and raise awareness of Galapagos conservation both in the UK and in Ecuador to ensure the unique flora and fauna on the Islands are preserved for future generations to enjoy.

Ambassadors for the charity include Liz Bonnin, Stanley Johnson, Henry Nicholls, Sarah Darwin, Monty Halls, Dr. Godfrey Merlen, Randal Keynes, Julian Fitter, Angela Darwin, Jennifer Stone, Dr. Antje Steinfurth, Nigel Sitwell, Dorothy Latsis and Sir James Barlow. Of these, Sir James, Sarah Darwin and Randal Keynes are descended from Charles Darwin - Angela Darwin is a Darwin by marriage (she is the widow of George Pember Darwin, son of Charles Galton Darwin).

Projects
GCT support projects under the key areas of: conserving endemic species, controlling invasive species, marine conservation, conservation through education and sustainable development. Working closely with authorities and organisations in Galapagos and mainland Ecuador, the charity supports a wide array of projects from species-specific studies and ecosystem-scale restoration projects to promoting local recycling initiatives and education.

GCT is involved in the Mangrove Finch Project that is working to save the Critically Endangered mangrove finch (Camarhynchus heliobates) from extinction.

GCT has partnered with the Royal Geographical Society (with IBG) to run their teaching resource Discovering Galapagos. The resource consists of two websites, one adapted and linked to the UK curriculum and one adapted for delivery in Galapagos and mainland Ecuador. A bilingual blog connects the two sites allowing for interactions between students from around the world.

References

External links 
  Official Galapagos Conservation Trust website
   DiscoveringGalapagos.org.uk
  DescubriendoGalapagos.ec—

Galápagos Islands
Nature conservation in Ecuador
Environmental charities based in the United Kingdom
Land trusts
Environmental organizations established in 1995
1995 establishments in the United Kingdom